Alanaq (also Romanized as Alānaq and Ālānaq; also known as Alana) is a village in Qurigol Rural District of the Central District of Bostanabad County, East Azerbaijan province, Iran. At the 2006 census, its population was 3,434 in 954 households. The following census in 2011 counted 3,705 people in 1,123 households. The latest census in 2016 showed a population of 3,646 people in 1,164 households; it was the largest village in its rural district.

References 

Bostanabad County

Populated places in East Azerbaijan Province

Populated places in Bostanabad County